Kapus Kondyachi Goshta  is a 2014 Indian Woman oriented as well as an agricultural related movie written by Prasad Namjoshiand directed by  Mrunalini Bhosale. He is popular on television and has acted in several Marathi movies. It features  Makarand Anaspure,  Samidha Guru  and   Bharat Ganeshpure  in the lead roles. Supporting roles are played by Gauri Konge, Mohini Kulkarni and  Netra Mali . The film is produced by Ravindra alias Nitin Bhosale . The background score was composed by Shailesh Dani and the cinematography was handled by Wasim Maner.

The movie received a lot of awards and appreciations with the support of All Lights Film Services (ALFS), a leading Film Festival Consultancy.

Plot

"Kapus Kondyachi Goshta" a story of triumph over tragedy, where the strong will of simple village girl wins over all odds to become an inspiration for many.

In this land of cotton growers, the heartrending farmer's suicides are a continuing tragedy in Maharashtra. It is these grim circumstances that unfold the story of Joyti along with her three sisters as they stand against village head and ever-fickle villagers.

This is a true story that chronicles the victory over social ostracisation, poverty and hardship.

The film inspires the audience while giving them a deep insight into the lives and struggles of a woman in heart of India

Cast
Makarand Anaspure As Lawyer
 Samidha Guru as Jyoti
 Bharat Ganeshpure as Dada Patil
 Gauri Konge as Ratna
 Mohini Kulkarni as Chanda
 Netra Mali as Bali

Music Director - Shailesh Dani.

Lyrics - Indrajit Bhalerao.

Festival screenings
The film was an official selection for the following film festivals:
 International Indian Film Festival of Queensland in Brisbane - International Competition section.
 Gwinnett Center International Film Festival, USA  - International Competition section.
 9th Seattle South Asian Film Festival, USA - International Competition section.
 Silk Road International Film Festival, China - International Competition section.

Oscar Contention

The movie is competing for Oscar  Race 2015.  And the movie has been screened at Laemmle Theatres, CA, Los Angeles.

The Academy of Motion Picture, Arts and Sciences unleashed the names of three hundred and twenty three movies which made its way to the final list of contention.  From that the movie KAPUS KONDYACHI GOSHTA got Contention in 87th Oscar for ‘Best Picture' Category.

Accolades
The film has received the following accolades:
 Dada Saheb Phalke Film Festival
 2014: Best Film - Women  Empowerment - Mrs.Mrunalini Bhosale
 International Indian Film Festival of Queensland in Brisbane
 2014: Best Feature Film - Kapus Kondyachi Goshta 
Sahyadri Cine Awards 2014
 2014: Best Feature Film - Kapus Kondyachi Goshta
Maharashtra State Film Awards 2014
 2014 : Best Actress Award - Samidha Guru

References

External links

 Official Facebook Page of Kapus Kondyachi Goshta
 Official Twitter Page of Kapus Kondyachi Goshta
Official Website

2014 films
2010s Marathi-language films